The Tiznow Handicap is an American Thoroughbred horse race at Louisiana Downs in Bossier City, Louisiana whose inaugural running took place on September 20, 2008. Contested on dirt over a distance of 8.5 furlongs ( miles), it is open to horses age three and older.

Part of the Breeders' Cup Challenge series, the winner of the 2008 Tiznow Handicap automatically qualified for the Breeders' Cup Dirt Mile.

Records
Speed  record:
 1:44.22 - Jonesboro (2008)

Winners of the Tiznow Handicap

References
 Louisiana Downs website
 Breeders' Cup Challenge series at the  Breeders' Cup official website 

Listed stakes races in the United States
Open mile category horse races
Horse races in Louisiana
Recurring sporting events established in 2008
2008 establishments in Louisiana